Snake eyes is a roll of two dice, with one pip on each dice.

Snake Eyes may also refer to:

Film
 Snake Eyes (1998 film), a crime thriller by Brian De Palma and starring Nicolas Cage
 Snake Eyes (2021 film), an action film based on the G.I. Joe character of the same name
 Dangerous Game (1993 film), or Snake Eyes, by Abel Ferrara

Music
 Snake Eyes (album), a 2000 album by Killa Tay featuring a guest appearance by Spider Loc
 "Snake Eyes" (The Alan Parsons Project song), a 1980 song from the album The Turn of a Friendly Card
 "Snake Eyes", a 1991 song by Main Source from the album Breaking Atoms
 "Snake Eye", a 1988 song by AC/DC on the "Heatseeker" single
 "Snake Eyes", a 2013 song by Amon Amarth from the Under the Influence edition of the album Deceiver of the Gods
 "Snake Eyes", a 2013 song by Sworn In from the album The Death Card
 "Snake Eyes", a 2013 song by Winds of Plague from the album Resistance
 "Snake Eyes", a 2015 song by Mumford & Sons from the album Wilder Mind
 "Snake Eyes", a 2022 song by Upon a Burning Body from the album Fury
 Snake Eyes, a 2022 EP by 100 gecs

Literature
 Snake Eyes, a thriller novel by Joyce Carol Oates, writing as Rosamond Smith
 Snake Eyes, a comics anthology published in the 1990s by Fantagraphics Books
 Snake Eyes, a mafia novel by Bill Bonanno and Joseph Pistone

Other uses
 The visual organs of snakes
 Snake Eyes (G.I. Joe), a fictional character in the G.I. Joe universe
 Snake Eyes, a professional wrestling throw
 "Snake Eyes", an episode of Camp Lazlo
 Snake Eyez, the gaming name of American professional fighting games player Darryl Lewis